Zafar Jadoon (born 1 December 1972) is a Pakistani first-class cricketer who played for Abbottabad cricket team.

References

External links
 

1972 births
Living people
Pakistani cricketers
Abbottabad cricketers
Cricketers from Abbottabad
Karachi cricketers